Howard A. Zucker (born September 6, 1959) served as the 16th commissioner of the New York State Department of Health from 2015-2021. He was appointed to the position by Governor Andrew Cuomo in 2015 and had served as Acting Commissioner the prior year after the abrupt resignation of Dr. Nirav Shah.

During the COVID-19 pandemic, he appeared frequently in media as the ultimate expert on the status of the pandemic in the State of New York.

In January 2021, the New York Attorney General’s office released a report showing that the New York Department of Health under-counted statewide nursing home deaths by as much as 50%. Both Governor Cuomo and Zucker were blamed for the under-count.

During the presidency of George W. Bush, Zucker was a White House Fellow  and latter Deputy Assistant Secretary of Health in the Department of Health and Human Services under Tommy Thompson. Afterwards, he served as the assistant Director-General of the World Health Organization.

References

External links
 Mary T. Bassett, M.D., M.P.H.

Commissioners of Health of the State of New York
George W. Bush administration personnel
World Health Organization officials
Medical administrators
American public health doctors
Living people
George Washington University School of Medicine & Health Sciences alumni
Fordham University School of Law alumni
White House Fellows
People from the Bronx
McGill University alumni
1959 births
Columbia Law School alumni
Alumni of the London School of Hygiene & Tropical Medicine
United States Department of Health and Human Services officials